Anthony Chisholm Abbott,  (born November 26, 1930) is a Canadian lawyer and former politician.

Born in Montreal, the son of Douglas Charles Abbott, Abbott was a lawyer by profession before being elected to the House of Commons of Canada as the Liberal Member of Parliament for Mississauga, Ontario in the 1974 federal election.

In 1976, he was appointed to the Cabinet of Prime Minister Pierre Trudeau as Minister of Consumer and Corporate Affairs. In 1977, he became Minister of State for Small Businesses. From 1978 until the defeat of the Trudeau government in the 1979 election, he was Minister of National Revenue.

Abbott lost his seat in the 1979 election. He attempted to return to the House of Commons as a Progressive Conservative candidate in the 1988 federal election running in Eglinton—Lawrence, but was unsuccessful.

After his defeat, Abbott returned to the private sector serving as president of the Retail Council of Canada. From 1980 until 1988, he was based in London (UK) as the business advisor and legal counsel at the branch office of a major Canadian law firm.

Electoral record

References

External links
 

1930 births
Living people
Anglophone Quebec people
Canadian Anglicans
Canadian expatriates in England
Canadian people of English descent
Liberal Party of Canada MPs
Members of the 20th Canadian Ministry
Members of the House of Commons of Canada from Ontario
Members of the King's Privy Council for Canada
Politicians from Montreal